Maricruz Lemus Meléndez (born 12 August 1992) is a Guatemalan retired footballer who played as a goalkeeper. She has been a member of the Guatemala women's national team.

International career
Lemus capped for Guatemala at senior level during the 2010 CONCACAF Women's World Cup Qualifying qualification, the 2012 CONCACAF Women's Olympic Qualifying Tournament (and its qualification) and the 2013 Central American Games.

References

1992 births
Living people
Guatemalan women's footballers
Guatemala women's international footballers
Women's association football goalkeepers
Central American Games bronze medalists for Guatemala
Central American Games medalists in football